The Greenville metropolitan area may refer to:

 Greenville micropolitan area, Mississippi, United States
 Greenville metropolitan area, North Carolina, United States
 Greenville micropolitan area, Ohio, United States
 Greenville metropolitan area, South Carolina, United States

See also
Greenville (disambiguation)